The New Market Cross of Honor was a commemorative medal established in 1904 by the Virginia Military Institute Alumni Association (VMIAA) to honor Confederate veterans who served in the Virginia Military Institute Corps of Cadets at the Battle of New Market (May 15, 1864) during the American Civil War.

History 
The New Market Cross of Honor award was presented to the 294 cadets who fought at the Battle of New Market on May 15, 1864, turning the tide of the battle for the Confederacy. The cadets had previously been listed on the Confederate Roll of Honor. A notable recipient was Moses Jacob Ezekiel. A medal was also presented to Eliza Catherine Clinedinst Crim, a New Market resident, who had nursed injured cadets after the battle. Upon her death in 1931, cadets served as the pallbearers and her grave marker said "Mother of the New Market Corps". Since 1962, VMI has awarded a similar "New Market Medal" to distinguished alumni.

References

1904 establishments in Virginia
Awards honoring alumni
Awards established in 1904
Awards disestablished in 1904
Military awards and decorations of the American Civil War
Virginia Military Institute
Lost Cause of the Confederacy
Campaign medals
Battle of New Market
Awards by university and college in the United States